PAOK B.C. in international competitions is the history and statistics of PAOK B.C. in the FIBA Europe and Euroleague Basketball Company European-wide professional club basketball competitions.

1960s

1959–60 FIBA European Champions Cup, 1st–tier
The 1959–60 FIBA European Champions Cup was the 3rd installment of the European top-tier level professional basketball club competition FIBA European Champions Cup (now called EuroLeague), running from November 18, 1959 to May 15, 1960. The trophy was won by the title holder Rīgas ASK, who defeated Dinamo Tbilisi by a result of 130–113 in a two-legged final on a home and away basis. Overall, PAOK achieved in the present competition a record of 0 wins against 2 defeats, in only one round. More detailed:

First round
 Tie played on November 29, 1959 and on December 13, 1959.

|}

1970s

1974–75 FIBA Korać Cup, 3rd–tier
The 1974–75 FIBA Korać Cup was the 4th installment of the European 3rd-tier level professional basketball club competition FIBA Korać Cup, running from November 5, 1974 to March 25, 1975. The trophy was won by the title holder Birra Forst Cantù, who defeated CF Barcelona by a result of 181–154 in a two-legged final on a home and away basis. Overall, PAOK achieved in present competition a record of 1 win against 1 defeat, in two successive rounds. More detailed:

First round
 Bye

Second round
 Tie played on November 26, 1974 and on December 3, 1974.

|}

1975–76 FIBA Korać Cup, 3rd–tier
The 1975–76 FIBA Korać Cup was the 5th installment of the European 3rd-tier level professional basketball club competition FIBA Korać Cup, running from October 28, 1975 to March 23, 1976. The trophy was won by Jugoplastika, who defeated Chinamartini Torino by a result of 179–166 in a two-legged final on a home and away basis. Overall, PAOK achieved in present competition a record of 1 win against 1 defeat, in two successive rounds. More detailed:

First round
 Bye

Second round
 Tie played on November 18, 1975 and on November 25, 1975.

|}

1980s

1981–82 FIBA Korać Cup, 3rd–tier
The 1981–82 FIBA Korać Cup was the 11th installment of the European 3rd-tier level professional basketball club competition FIBA Korać Cup, running from October 7, 1981 to March 18, 1982. The trophy was won by Limoges CSP, who defeated Šibenka by a result of 90–84 at Palasport San Lazzaro in Padua, Italy. Overall, PAOK achieved in present competition a record of 2 wins against 2 defeats, in two successive rounds. More detailed:

First round
 Tie played on October 7, 1981 and on October 14, 1981.

|}

Second round
 Tie played on November 4, 1981 and on November 11, 1981.

|}

1982–83 FIBA European Cup Winners' Cup, 2nd–tier
The 1982–83 FIBA European Cup Winners' Cup was the 17th installment of FIBA's 2nd-tier level European-wide professional club basketball competition FIBA European Cup Winners' Cup (lately called FIBA Saporta Cup), running from October 5, 1982 to March 9, 1983. The trophy was won by Scavolini Pesaro, who defeated ASVEL by a result of 111–99 at Palacio Municipal de Deportes in Palma de Mallorca, Spain. Overall, PAOK achieved in the present competition a record of 3 wins against 1 defeat, in two successive rounds. More detailed:

First round
 Tie played on October 5, 1982 and on October 12, 1982.

|}

Top 16
 Tie played on November 2, 1982 and on November 9, 1982.

|}

1983–84 FIBA Korać Cup, 3rd–tier
The 1983–84 FIBA Korać Cup was the 13th installment of the European 3rd-tier level professional basketball club competition FIBA Korać Cup, running from September 28, 1983 to March 15, 1984. The trophy was won by Orthez, who defeated Crvena zvezda by a result of 97–73 at Palais des sports Pierre-de-Coubertin in Paris, France. Overall, PAOK achieved in present competition a record of 3 wins against 5 defeats, in three successive rounds. More detailed:

First round
 Bye

Second round
 Tie played on October 26, 1983 and on November 2, 1983.

|}

Top 16
 Day 1 (December 7, 1983)

|}

 Day 2 (December 14, 1983)

|}

 Day 3 (January 11, 1984)

|}

 Day 4 (January 18, 1984)

|}

 Day 5 (January 25, 1984)

|}
*Overtime at the end of regulation (73–73).

 Day 6 (February 1, 1984)

|}

 Group C standings:

1984–85 FIBA European Cup Winners' Cup, 2nd–tier
The 1984–85 FIBA European Cup Winners' Cup was the 19th installment of FIBA's 2nd-tier level European-wide professional club basketball competition FIBA European Cup Winners' Cup (lately called FIBA Saporta Cup), running from October 2, 1984 to March 19, 1985. The trophy was won by FC Barcelona, who defeated Žalgiris by a result of 77–73 at Palais des Sports in Grenoble, France. Overall, PAOK achieved in the present competition a record of 3 wins against 7 defeats, in three successive rounds. More detailed:

First round
 Tie played on October 2, 1984 and on October 9, 1984.

|}

Top 16
 Tie played on October 30, 1984 and on November 6, 1984.

|}

Quarterfinals
 Day 1 (December 4, 1984)

|}

 Day 2 (December 11, 1984)

|}

 Day 3 (January 9, 1985)

|}

 Day 4 (January 15, 1985)

|}

 Day 5 (January 23, 1985)

|}

 Day 6 (January 29, 1985)

|}

 Group A standings:

1985–86 FIBA Korać Cup, 3rd–tier
The 1985–86 FIBA Korać Cup was the 15th installment of the European 3rd-tier level professional basketball club competition FIBA Korać Cup, running from October 2, 1985 to March 27, 1986. The trophy was won by Banco di Roma, who defeated Mobilgirgi Caserta by a result of 157–150 in a two-legged final on a home and away basis. Overall, PAOK achieved in present competition a record of 5 wins against 5 defeats, in three successive rounds. More detailed:

First round
 Tie played on October 2, 1985 and on October 9, 1985.

|}

Second round
 Tie played on October 30, 1985 and on November 6, 1985.

|}

Top 16
 Day 1 (December 4, 1985)

|}

 Day 2 (December 11, 1985)

|}

 Day 3 (January 8, 1986)

|}

 Day 4 (January 15, 1986)

|}

 Day 5 (January 22, 1986)

|}

 Day 6 (January 29, 1986)

|}

 Group B standings:

1986–87 FIBA Korać Cup, 3rd–tier
The 1986–87 FIBA Korać Cup was the 16th installment of the European 3rd-tier level professional basketball club competition FIBA Korać Cup, running from October 1, 1986 to March 25, 1987. The trophy was won by FC Barcelona, who defeated Limoges CSP by a result of 203–171 in a two-legged final on a home and away basis. Overall, PAOK achieved in present competition a record of 2 wins against 2 defeats, in two successive rounds. More detailed:

First round
 Tie played on October 1, 1986 and on October 8, 1986.

|}

Second round
 Tie played on October 29, 1986 and on November 5, 1986.

|}

1987–88 FIBA Korać Cup, 3rd–tier
The 1987–88 FIBA Korać Cup was the 17th installment of the European 3rd-tier level professional basketball club competition FIBA Korać Cup, running from September 23, 1987 to March 9, 1988. The trophy was won by Real Madrid, who defeated Cibona by a result of 195–183 in a two-legged final on a home and away basis. Overall, PAOK achieved in present competition a record of 3 wins against 5 defeats, in three successive rounds. More detailed:

First round
 Bye

Second round
 Tie played on October 14, 1987 and on October 21, 1987.

|}

Top 16
 Day 1 (December 2, 1987)

|}

 Day 2 (December 8, 1987)

|}

 Day 3 (December 16, 1987)

|}

 Day 4 (January 6, 1988)

|}

 Day 5 (January 13, 1988)

|}
*Overtime at the end of regulation (83–83).

 Day 6 (January 20, 1988)

|}

 Group C standings:

1988–89 FIBA Korać Cup, 3rd–tier
The 1988–89 FIBA Korać Cup was the 18th installment of the European 3rd-tier level professional basketball club competition FIBA Korać Cup, running from October 12, 1988 to March 22, 1989. The trophy was won by Partizan, who defeated Wiwa Vismara Cantù by a result of 177–171 in a two-legged final on a home and away basis. Overall, PAOK achieved in present competition a record of 3 wins against 1 defeat, in two successive rounds. More detailed:

First round
 Tie played on October 12, 1988 and on October 19, 1988.

|}

Second round
 Tie played on November 2, 1988 and on November 9, 1988.

|}
*Although the global basket average between PAOK and Crvena zvezda was tied at the end of the match, the Yugoslavian club qualified because of their higher number of away points (85 vs. 76).

1990s

1989–90 FIBA European Cup Winners' Cup, 2nd–tier
The 1989–90 FIBA European Cup Winners' Cup was the 24th installment of FIBA's 2nd-tier level European-wide professional club basketball competition FIBA European Cup Winners' Cup (lately called FIBA Saporta Cup), running from September 26, 1989 to March 13, 1990. The trophy was won by Knorr Bologna, who defeated the title holder Real Madrid by a result of 79–74 at PalaGiglio in Florence, Italy. Overall, PAOK achieved in the present competition a record of 7 wins against 3 defeats, in four successive rounds. More detailed:

First round
 Bye

Top 16
 Tie played on October 24, 1989 and on October 31, 1989.

|}

Quarterfinals
 Day 1 (December 5, 1989)

|}

 Day 2 (December 12, 1989)

|}

 Day 3 (January 16, 1990)

|}

 Day 4 (January 23, 1990)

|}

 Day 5 (January 30, 1990)

|}

 Day 6 (February 6, 1990)

|}

 Group B standings:

Semifinals
 Tie played on February 20, 1990 and on February 27, 1990.

|}

1990–91 FIBA European Cup Winners' Cup, 2nd–tier
The 1990–91 FIBA European Cup Winners' Cup was the 25th installment of FIBA's 2nd-tier level European-wide professional club basketball competition FIBA European Cup Winners' Cup (lately called FIBA Saporta Cup), running from September 25, 1990 to March 26, 1991. The trophy was won by PAOK, who defeated CAI Zaragoza by a result of 76–72 at Patinoire des Vernets in Geneva, Switzerland. Overall, PAOK achieved in the present competition a record of 7 wins against 4 defeats, in five successive rounds. More detailed:

First round
 Bye

Top 16
 Tie played on October 23, 1990 and on October 30, 1990.

|}

Quarterfinals
 Day 1 (December 11, 1990)

|}

 Day 2 (December 18, 1990)

|}

 Day 3 (January 8, 1991)

|}

 Day 4 (January 15, 1991)

|}

 Day 5 (January 22, 1991)

|}

 Day 6 (January 29, 1991)

|}

 Group B standings:

Semifinals
 Tie played on February 12, 1991 and on February 26, 1991.

|}

Final
 March 26, 1991 at Patinoire des Vernets in Geneva, Switzerland.

|}

1991–92 FIBA European Cup, 2nd–tier
The 1991–92 FIBA European Cup was the 26th installment of FIBA's 2nd-tier level European-wide professional club basketball competition FIBA European Cup (lately called FIBA Saporta Cup), running from September 10, 1991 to March 17, 1992. The trophy was won by Real Madrid Asegurator, who defeated the title holder PAOK by a result of 65–63 at Palais des Sports de Beaulieu in Nantes, France. Overall, PAOK achieved in the present competition a record of 13 wins against 3 defeats, in six successive rounds. More detailed:

First round
 Bye

Second round
 Tie played on October 1, 1991 and on October 8, 1991.

|}

Third round
 Bye

Top 12
 Day 1 (November 26, 1991)

|}

 Day 2 (December 3, 1991)

|}

 Day 3 (December 11, 1991)

|}

 Day 4 (December 17, 1991)

|}

 Day 5 (January 7, 1992)

|}

 Day 6 (January 14, 1992)

|}

 Day 7 (January 21, 1992)

|}

 Day 8 (January 28, 1992)

|}

 Day 9 (February 4, 1992)

|}

 Day 10 (February 11, 1992)

|}

 Group A standings:

Semifinals
 Best-of-3 playoff: Game 1 away on February 20, 1992 / Game 2 at home on February 25, 1992 / Game 3 at home on February 27, 1992.

|}

Final
 March 17, 1992 at Palais des Sports de Beaulieu in Nantes, France

|}

1992–93 FIBA European League, 1st–tier
The 1992–93 FIBA European League was the 36th installment of the European top-tier level professional club competition for basketball clubs (now called EuroLeague), running from September 10, 1992 to April 15, 1993. The trophy was won by Limoges CSP, who defeated Benetton Treviso by a result of 59–55 at Peace and Friendship Stadium in Piraeus, Greece. Overall, PAOK achieved in present competition a record of 15 wins against 5 defeats, in six successive rounds. More detailed:

First round
 Tie played on September 10, 1992 and on September 17, 1992.

|}

Second round
 Tie played on October 1, 1992 and on October 8, 1992.

|}
*Crvena zvezda was drawn for the competition but was not allowed to compete due to United Nations embargo on FR Yugoslavia. So PAOK went through with a walkover.

Top 16
 Day 1 (October 29, 1992)

|}

 Day 2 (November 5, 1992)

|}

 Day 3 (November 26, 1992)
Bye: Partizan was the title holder but was not allowed to compete due to United Nations embargo on FR Yugoslavia.

 Day 4 (December 3, 1992)

|}

 Day 5 (December 10, 1992)

|}

 Day 6 (December 17, 1992)

|}

 Day 7 (January 6, 1993)

|}

 Day 8 (January 14, 1993)

|}
*Two Overtimes at the end of regulation (52–52 and 57–57).

 Day 9 (January 20, 1993)

|}

 Day 10 (January 28, 1993)
Bye: Partizan was the title holder but was not allowed to compete due to United Nations embargo on FR Yugoslavia.

 Day 11 (February 4, 1993)

|}

 Day 12 (February 11, 1993)

|}

 Day 13 (February 17, 1993)

|}

 Day 14 (February 25, 1993)

|}

 Group A standings:

Quarterfinals
 Best-of-3 playoff: Game 1 away on March 11, 1993 / Game 2 at home on March 16, 1993.

|}

Final four
The 1993 FIBA European League Final Four, was the 1992–93 season's FIBA European League Final Four tournament, organized by FIBA Europe.

 Semifinals: April 13, 1993 at Peace and Friendship Stadium in Piraeus, Greece.

|}

 3rd place game: April 15, 1993 at Peace and Friendship Stadium in Piraeus, Greece.

|}

 Final four standings:

1993–94 FIBA Korać Cup, 3rd–tier
The 1993–94 FIBA Korać Cup was the 23rd installment of the European 3rd-tier level professional basketball club competition FIBA Korać Cup, running from September 8, 1993 to March 16, 1994. The trophy was won by PAOK Bravo, who defeated Stefanel Trieste by a result of 175–157 in a two-legged final on a home and away basis. Overall, PAOK Bravo achieved in present competition a record of 12 wins against 2 defeats, in seven successive rounds. More detailed:

First round
 Bye

Second round
 Bye

Third round
 Tie played on October 27, 1993 and on November 3, 1993.

|}

Top 16
 Day 1 (November 24, 1993)

|}

 Day 2 (November 30, 1993)

|}

 Day 3 (December 8, 1993)

|}

 Day 4 (December 15, 1993)

|}

 Day 5 (January 5, 1994)

|}

 Day 6 (January 12, 1994)

|}

 Group C standings:

Quarterfinals
 Tie played on January 26, 1994 and on February 2, 1994.

|}

Semifinals
 Tie played on February 16, 1994 and on February 23, 1994.

|}

Finals
 Tie played on March 9, 1994 at Alexandreio Melathron in Thessaloniki, Greece and on March 16, 1994 at Palazzo dello sport Cesare Rubini in Trieste, Italy.

|}

1994–95 FIBA European League, 1st–tier
The 1994–95 FIBA European League was the 38th installment of the European top-tier level professional club competition for basketball clubs (now called EuroLeague), running from September 8, 1994 to April 13, 1995. The trophy was won by Real Madrid Teka, who defeated Olympiacos by a result of 73–61 at Pabellón Príncipe Felipe in Zaragoza, Spain. Overall, PAOK Bravo achieved in present competition a record of 7 wins against 9 defeats, in three successive rounds. More detailed:

First round
 Bye

Second round
 Tie played on September 29, 1994 and on October 6, 1994.

|}

Top 16
 Day 1 (October 27, 1994)

|}

 Day 2 (November 2, 1994)

|}

 Day 3 (November 23, 1994)

|}

 Day 4 (November 30, 1994)

|}

 Day 5 (December 8, 1994)

|}

 Day 6 (December 14, 1994)

|}

 Day 7 (January 4, 1995)

|}

 Day 8 (January 12, 1995)

|}

 Day 9 (January 18, 1995)

|}

 Day 10 (January 26, 1995)

|}

 Day 11 (February 1, 1995)

|}

 Day 12 (February 8, 1995)

|}

 Day 13 (February 16, 1995)

|}

 Day 14 (February 22, 1995)

|}

 Group A standings:

1995–96 FIBA European Cup, 2nd–tier
The 1995–96 FIBA European Cup was the 30th installment of FIBA's 2nd-tier level European-wide professional club basketball competition FIBA European Cup (lately called FIBA Saporta Cup), running from September 5, 1995 to March 12, 1996. The trophy was won by Taugrés, who defeated PAOK by a result of 88–81 at Pabellón Álava in Vitoria-Gasteiz, Spain. Overall, PAOK achieved in the present competition a record of 15 wins against 4 defeats, in six successive rounds. More detailed:

First round
 Tie played on September 9, 1995 and on September 12, 1995.

|}

Second round
 Tie played on September 26, 1995 and on October 3, 1995.

|}

Third round
 Tie played on October 24, 1995 and on October 31, 1995.

|}

Top 12
 Day 1 (November 21, 1995)

|}
*Overtime at the end of regulation (72–72).

 Day 2 (November 28, 1995)

|}

 Day 3 (December 5, 1995)

|}

 Day 4 (December 12, 1995)

|}

 Day 5 (December 19, 1995)

|}

 Day 6 (January 2, 1996)

|}

 Day 7 (January 9, 1996)

|}

 Day 8 (January 16, 1996)

|}

 Day 9 (January 23, 1996)

|}

 Day 10 (January 30, 1996)

|}

 Group B standings:

Semifinals
 Best-of-3 playoff: Game 1 away on February 6, 1996 / Game 2 at home on February 13, 1996.

|}

Final
 March 12, 1996 at Pabellón Álava in Vitoria-Gasteiz, Spain

|}

1996–97 FIBA Korać Cup, 3rd–tier
The 1996–97 FIBA Korać Cup was the 26th installment of the European 3rd-tier level professional basketball club competition FIBA Korać Cup, running from September 11, 1996 to April 3, 1997. The trophy was won by Aris, who defeated Tofaş by a result of 154–147 in a two-legged final on a home and away basis. Overall, PAOK achieved in present competition a record of 9 wins against 1 defeat, in four successive rounds. More detailed:

First round
 Bye

Second round
 Day 1 (October 2, 1996)

|}

 Day 2 (October 9, 1996)

|}

 Day 3 (October 15, 1996)

|}

 Day 4 (November 6, 1996)

|}

 Day 5 (November 12, 1996)

|}

 Day 6 (November 20, 1996)

|}

 Group M standings:

Third round
 Tie played on December 4, 1996 and on December 11, 1996.

|}

Top 16
 Tie played on January 15, 1997 and on January 22, 1997.

|}

1997–98 FIBA EuroLeague, 1st–tier
The 1997–98 FIBA EuroLeague was the 41st installment of the European top-tier level professional club competition for basketball clubs (now called simply EuroLeague), running from September 18, 1997 to April 23, 1998. The trophy was won by Kinder Bologna, who defeated AEK by a result of 58–44 at Palau Sant Jordi in Barcelona, Spain. Overall, PAOK achieved in present competition a record of 10 wins against 9 defeats, in two successive rounds. More detailed:

First round
 Day 1 (September 18, 1997)

|}

 Day 2 (September 25, 1997)

|}

 Day 3 (October 1, 1997)

|}

 Day 4 (October 9, 1997)

|}

 Day 5 (October 22, 1997)

|}

 Day 6 (November 6, 1997)

|}

 Day 7 (November 12, 1997)

|}

 Day 8 (November 19, 1997)

|}

 Day 9 (December 11, 1997)

|}

 Day 10 (December 17, 1997)

|}

 Group B standings:

Second round
 Day 1 (January 8, 1998)

|}

 Day 2 (January 14, 1998)

|}

 Day 3 (January 22, 1998)

|}

 Day 4 (February 5, 1998)

|}

 Day 5 (February 11, 1998)

|}
*Overtime at the end of regulation (64–64).

 Day 6 (February 18, 1998)

|}

 Group F standings:

Top 16
 Best-of-3 playoff: Game 1 away on March 3, 1998 / Game 2 at home on March 5, 1998 / Game 3 away on March 12, 1998.

|}
*Overtime at the end of regulation (69–69).

1998–99 FIBA EuroLeague, 1st–tier
The 1998–99 FIBA EuroLeague was the 42nd installment of the European top-tier level professional club competition for basketball clubs (now called simply EuroLeague), running from September 24, 1998 to April 22, 1999. The trophy was won by Žalgiris, who defeated the title holder Kinder Bologna by a result of 82–74 at Olympiahalle in Munich, Germany. Overall, PAOK achieved in present competition a record of 7 wins against 9 defeats, in two successive rounds. More detailed:

First round
 Day 1 (September 23, 1998)

|}

 Day 2 (September 30, 1998)

|}

 Day 3 (October 7, 1998)

|}

 Day 4 (October 14, 1998)

|}

 Day 5 (October 22, 1998)

|}

 Day 6 (November 5, 1998)

|}

 Day 7 (November 11, 1998)

|}

 Day 8 (November 19, 1998)

|}

 Day 9 (December 9, 1998)

|}

 Day 10 (December 17, 1998)

|}

 Group D standings:

Second round
 Day 1 (January 7, 1999)

|}

 Day 2 (January 13, 1999)

|}

 Day 3 (January 20, 1999)

|}

 Day 4 (February 4, 1999)

|}

 Day 5 (February 10, 1999)

|}

 Day 6 (February 17, 1999)

|}

 Group G standings:

2000s

1999–2000 FIBA EuroLeague, 1st–tier
The 1999–2000 FIBA EuroLeague was the 43rd installment of the European top-tier level professional club competition for basketball clubs (now called simply EuroLeague), running from September 23, 1999 to April 20, 2000. The trophy was won by Panathinaikos, who defeated Maccabi Elite Tel Aviv by a result of 73–67 at PAOK Sports Arena in Thessaloniki, Greece. Overall, PAOK achieved in present competition a record of 8 wins against 11 defeats, in three successive rounds. More detailed:

First round
 Day 1 (September 23, 1999)

|}

 Day 2 (September 29, 1999)

|}

 Day 3 (September 6, 1999)

|}

 Day 4 (October 20, 1999)

|}

 Day 5 (October 28, 1999)

|}

 Day 6 (November 4, 1999)

|}

 Day 7 (November 10, 1999)

|}

 Day 8 (November 17, 1999)

|}

 Day 9 (December 8, 1999)

|}

 Day 10 (December 15, 1999)

|}

 Group A standings:

Second round
 Day 1 (January 6, 2000)

|}

 Day 2 (January 13, 2000)

|}

 Day 3 (January 19, 2000)

|}

 Day 4 (February 3, 2000)

|}

 Day 5 (February 9, 2000)

|}

 Day 6 (February 17, 2000)

|}

 Group F standings:

Top 16
 Best-of-3 playoff: Game 1 away on February 29, 2000 / Game 2 at home on March 2, 2000 / Game 3 away on March 9, 2000.

|}

2000–01 Euroleague, 1st–tier
The 2000–01 Euroleague was the inaugural season of the EuroLeague, under the newly formed Euroleague Basketball Company's authority, and it was the 44th installment of the European top-tier level professional club competition for basketball clubs, running from October 19, 2000 to May 10, 2001. The trophy was won by Kinder Bologna, who defeated Tau Cerámica in a Best-of-5 playoff final series by a result of 3–2. Overall, PAOK achieved in present competition a record of 8 wins against 5 defeats, in two successive rounds. More detailed:

Regular season
 Day 1 (October 18, 2000)

|}
*Overtime at the end of regulation (76–76).

 Day 2 (October 25, 2000)

|}

 Day 3 (November 1, 2000)

|}

 Day 4 (November 8, 2000)

|}

 Day 5 (November 15, 2000)

|}

 Day 6 (December 6, 2000)

|}

 Day 7 (December 13, 2000)

|}

 Day 8 (December 20, 2000)

|}

 Day 9 (January 10, 2001)

|}

 Day 10 (January 18, 2001)

|}

 Group D standings:

Top 16
 Best-of-3 playoff: Game 1 at home on February 1, 2001 / Game 2 away on February 8, 2001 / Game 3 at home on February 14, 2001.

|}

2001–02 FIBA Korać Cup, 3rd–tier
The 2001–02 FIBA Korać Cup was the 31st installment of the European 3rd-tier level professional basketball club competition FIBA Korać Cup, running from September 26, 2001 to April 17, 2002. The trophy was won by SLUC Nancy, who defeated Lokomotiv Mineralnye Vody by a result of 172–167 in a two-legged final on a home and away basis. Overall, PAOK achieved in present competition a record of 5 wins against 3 defeats, in two successive rounds. More detailed:

First round
 Bye

Second round
 Tie played on October 16, 2001 and on October 23, 2001.

|}

Third round
 Day 1 (November 14, 2001)

|}

 Day 2 (December 5, 2001)

|}

 Day 3 (December 12, 2001)

|}

 Day 4 (December 19, 2001)

|}

 Day 5 (January 9, 2002)

|}

 Day 6 (January 16, 2002)

|}

 Group E standings:

2002–03 FIBA Europe Champions Cup, 4th–tier
The 2002–03 FIBA Europe Champions Cup was the 1st installment of FIBA's 4th-tier level European-wide professional club basketball competition FIBA Europe Champions Cup (lately called FIBA EuroCup Challenge), running from October 1, 2002 to May 4, 2003. The trophy was won by Aris, who defeated Prokom Trefl Sopot by a result of 84–83 at Alexandreio Melathron in Thessaloniki, Greece. Overall, PAOK achieved in the present competition a record of 9 wins against 7 defeats, in two successive rounds. More detailed:

Regular season
 Day 1 (October 2, 2002)

|}

 Day 2 (October 8, 2002)

|}

 Day 3 (October 16, 2002)

|}

 Day 4 (October 23, 2002)

|}

 Day 5 (October 29, 2002)

|}

 Day 6 (November 5, 2002)

|}

 Day 7 (November 12, 2002)

|}

 Day 8 (December 4, 2002)

|}

 Day 9 (December 10, 2002)

|}

 Day 10 (December 18, 2002)

|}

 Group D standings:

Pan-European phase (Top 23)
 Day 1 (February 4, 2003)

|}

 Day 2 (February 11, 2003)

|}

 Day 3 (February 25, 2003)

|}

 Day 4 (March 4, 2003)

|}

 Day 5 (March 18, 2003)

|}

 Day 6 (March 26, 2003)

|}

 Group B standings:

2003–04 FIBA Europe League, 3rd–tier
The 2003–04 FIBA Europe League was the 1st installment of FIBA's 3rd-tier level European-wide professional club basketball competition FIBA Europe League (lately called FIBA Europe Cup), running from October 15, 2003 to April 24, 2004. The trophy was won by UNICS, who defeated TIM Maroussi by a result of 87–63 at Basket-Hall Kazan in Kazan, Russia. Overall, PAOK achieved in the present competition a record of 5 wins against 2 defeats, in only one round. More detailed:

Regular season
 Day 1 (October 14, 2003)

|}

 Day 2 (October 22, 2003)

|}

 Day 3 (October 28, 2003)

|}

 Day 4 (November 5, 2003)

|}

 Day 5 (November 12, 2003)

|}

 Day 6 (November 18, 2003)

|}
*Overtime at the end of regulation (83–83).

 Day 7 (November 26, 2003)

|}
#PAOK refused to travel to Ankara to play their competition day 7 game and withdrew from the tournament. Later, FIBA Europe declared all their previous and future games null and void.

2004–05 ULEB Cup, 2nd–tier
The 2004–05 ULEB Cup was the 3rd installment of ULEB's 2nd-tier level European-wide professional club basketball competition ULEB Cup (lately called EuroCup Basketball), running from November 9, 2004 to April 19, 2005. The trophy was won by Lietuvos rytas, who defeated Makedonikos by a result of 78–74 at Spiroudome in Charleroi, Belgium. Overall, PAOK achieved in the present competition a record of 11 wins against 3 defeats, in three successive rounds. More detailed:

Regular season
 Day 1 (November 9, 2004)

|}

 Day 2 (November 16, 2004)

|}

 Day 3 (November 23, 2004)

|}

 Day 4 (November 30, 2004)

|}
*Overtime at the end of regulation (76–76).

 Day 5 (December 7, 2004)

|}

 Day 6 (December 14, 2004)

|}

 Day 7 (December 21, 2004)

|}

 Day 8 (January 4, 2005)

|}

 Day 9 (January 12, 2005)

|}

 Day 10 (January 18, 2005)

|}

 Group A standings:

Top 16
 Tie played on February 1, 2005 and on February 9, 2005.

|}

Quarterfinals
 Tie played on March 1, 2005 and on March 8, 2005.

|}

2005–06 FIBA EuroCup, 3rd–tier
The 2005–06 FIBA EuroCup was the 3rd installment of FIBA's 3rd-tier level European-wide professional club basketball competition FIBA EuroCup (lately called FIBA Europe Cup), running from October 25, 2005 to April 9, 2006. The trophy was won by DKV Joventut, who defeated Khimki by a result of 88–63 at Kyiv Palace of Sports in Kyiv, Ukraine. Overall, PAOK achieved in the present competition a record of 1 win against 5 defeats, in only one round. More detailed:

Regular season
 Day 1 (October 25, 2005)

|}

 Day 2 (November 2, 2005)

|}
*Overtime at the end of regulation (68–68).

 Day 3 (November 9, 2005)

|}

 Day 4 (November 16, 2005)

|}

 Day 5 (November 23, 2005)

|}

 Day 6 (November 29, 2005)

|}

 Group E standings:

2006–07 ULEB Cup, 2nd–tier
The 2006–07 ULEB Cup was the 5th installment of ULEB's 2nd-tier level European-wide professional club basketball competition ULEB Cup (lately called EuroCup Basketball), running from October 31, 2006 to April 10, 2007. The trophy was won by Real Madrid, who defeated Lietuvos rytas by a result of 87–75 at Spiroudome in Charleroi, Belgium. Overall, PAOK achieved in the present competition a record of 6 wins against 6 defeats, in two successive rounds. More detailed:

Regular season
 Day 1 (October 31, 2006)

|}

 Day 2 (November 7, 2006)

|}

 Day 3 (November 14, 2006)

|}

 Day 4 (November 21, 2006)

|}

 Day 5 (November 28, 2006)

|}

 Day 6 (December 5, 2006)

|}

 Day 7 (December 12, 2006)

|}

 Day 8 (December 19, 2006)

|}

 Day 9 (January 9, 2007)

|}

 Day 10 (January 16, 2007)

|}

 Group D standings:

Top 16
 Tie played on January 30, 2007 and on February 13, 2007.

|}

2007–08 FIBA EuroCup, 3rd–tier
The 2007–08 FIBA EuroCup was the 5th installment of FIBA's 3rd-tier level European-wide professional club basketball competition FIBA EuroCup (lately called FIBA Europe Cup), running from October 30, 2007 to April 20, 2008. The trophy was won by Barons LMT, who defeated Dexia Union Mons-Hainaut by a result of 63–62 at Spyros Kyprianou Athletic Center in Limassol, Cyprus. Overall, PAOK Marfin achieved in the present competition a record of 3 wins against 5 defeats, in three successive rounds. More detailed:

First round
 Bye

Second round
 Tie played on November 20, 2007 and on November 27, 2007.

|}

Top 16
 Day 1 (December 11, 2007)

|}

 Day 2 (December 17, 2007)

|}

 Day 3 (December 11, 2007)

|}
*Overtime at the end of regulation (63–63).

 Day 4 (January 15, 2008)

|}

 Day 5 (January 22, 2008)

|}

 Day 6 (January 29, 2008)

|}

 Group A standings:

2010s

2010–11 Eurocup Basketball, 2nd–tier
The 2010–11 Eurocup Basketball was the 9th installment of ULEB's 2nd-tier level European-wide professional club basketball competition Eurocup Basketball, running from September 29, 2010 to April 17, 2011. The trophy was won by UNICS, who defeated Cajasol by a result of 92–77 at Palaverde in Treviso, Italy. Overall, PAOK achieved in the present competition a record of 3 wins against 3 defeats, in two successive rounds. More detailed:

Qualifying round
 Bye

Regular season
 Day 1 (November 16, 2010)

|}

 Day 2 (November 23, 2010)

|}

 Day 3 (November 30, 2010)

|}

 Day 4 (December 7, 2010)

|}

 Day 5 (December 14, 2010)

|}

 Day 6 (December 21, 2010)

|}

 Group F standings:

2011–12 Turkish Airlines Euroleague, 1st–tier
The 2011–12 Turkish Airlines Euroleague was the 12th season of the EuroLeague, under the Euroleague Basketball Company's authority, and it was the 55th installment of the European top-tier level professional club competition for basketball clubs, running from September 29, 2011 to May 13, 2012. The trophy was won by Olympiacos, who defeated CSKA Moscow by a result of 62–61 at Sinan Erdem Dome, in Istanbul, Turkey. Overall, PAOK achieved in present competition a record of 0 wins against 1 defeat, in only one round. More detailed:

Qualifying round 1
 September 30, 2011 at Siemens Arena, in Vilnius, Lithuania.

|}

Losers of qualifying tournaments entered 2011–12 Eurocup Basketball regular season.

2011–12 Eurocup Basketball, 2nd–tier
The 2011–12 Eurocup Basketball was the 10th installment of ULEB's 2nd-tier level European-wide professional club basketball competition Eurocup Basketball, running from September 27, 2011 to April 15, 2012. The trophy was won by Khimki, who defeated Valencia Basket by a result of 77–68 at Khimki Basketball Center in Khimki, Russia. Overall, PAOK achieved in the present competition a record of 1 win against 5 defeats, in only one round. More detailed:

Regular season
 Day 1 (November 15, 2011)

|}

 Day 2 (November 22, 2011)

|}

 Day 3 (November 29, 2011)

|}

 Day 4 (December 6, 2011)

|}

 Day 5 (December 13, 2011)

|}

 Day 6 (December 20, 2011)

|}

 Group B standings:

2013–14 Eurocup Basketball, 2nd–tier
The 2013–14 Eurocup Basketball was the 12th installment of ULEB's 2nd-tier level European-wide professional club basketball competition Eurocup Basketball, running from October 15, 2013 to May 7, 2014. The trophy was won by Valencia Basket, who defeated UNICS by a result of 165–140 in a two-legged final on a home and away basis. Overall, PAOK achieved in the present competition a record of 5 wins against 5 defeats, in only one round. More detailed:

Regular season
 Day 1 (October 15, 2013)

|}

 Day 2 (October 23, 2013)

|}

 Day 3 (October 30, 2013)

|}

 Day 4 (November 6, 2013)

|}

 Day 5 (November 13, 2013)

|}

 Day 6 (November 19, 2013)

|}

 Day 7 (November 27, 2013)

|}

 Day 8 (December 4, 2013)

|}

 Day 9 (December 10, 2013)

|}

 Day 10 (December 18, 2013)

|}

 Group F standings:

2014–15 Eurocup Basketball, 2nd–tier
The 2014–15 Eurocup Basketball was the 13th installment of ULEB's 2nd-tier level European-wide professional club basketball competition Eurocup Basketball, running from October 15, 2014 to April 29, 2015. The trophy was won by Khimki, who defeated Herbalife Gran Canaria by a result of 174–130 in a two-legged final on a home and away basis. Overall, PAOK achieved in the present competition a record of 7 wins against 9 defeats, in two successive rounds. More detailed:

Regular season
 Day 1 (October 15, 2014)

|}
*Two overtimes at the end of regulation (66–66 and 73–73).

 Day 2 (October 22, 2014)

|}

 Day 3 (October 28, 2014)

|}

 Day 4 (November 5, 2014)

|}

 Day 5 (November 12, 2014)

|}

 Day 6 (November 19, 2014)

|}

 Day 7 (November 25, 2014)

|}

 Day 8 (December 3, 2014)

|}

 Day 9 (December 10, 2014)

|}

 Day 10 (December 17, 2014)

|}

 Group F standings:

Last 32
 Day 1 (January 7, 2015)

|}

 Day 2 (January 14, 2015)

|}

 Day 3 (January 21, 2015)

|}

 Day 4 (January 28, 2015)

|}

 Day 5 (February 4, 2015)

|}

 Day 6 (February 11, 2015)

|}

 Group J standings:

2015–16 Eurocup Basketball, 2nd–tier
The 2015–16 Eurocup Basketball was the 14th installment of ULEB's 2nd-tier level European-wide professional club basketball competition Eurocup Basketball, running from October 14, 2015 to April 27, 2016. The trophy was won by Galatasaray Odeabank, who defeated SIG Strasbourg by a result of 140–133 in a two-legged final on a home and away basis. Overall, PAOK achieved in the present competition a record of 7 wins against 9 defeats, in two successive rounds. More detailed:

Regular season
 Day 1 (October 14, 2015)

|}

 Day 2 (October 21, 2015)

|}

 Day 3 (October 28, 2015)

|}

 Day 4 (November 4, 2015)

|}

 Day 5 (November 11, 2015)

|}

 Day 6 (November 18, 2015)

|}

 Day 7 (November 25, 2015)

|}

 Day 8 (December 2, 2015)

|}
*Overtime at the end of regulation (62–62).

 Day 9 (December 9, 2015)

|}

 Day 10 (December 16, 2015)

|}

 Group E standings:

Last 32
 Day 1 (January 6, 2016)

|}

 Day 2 (January 12, 2016)

|}

 Day 3 (January 19, 2016)

|}

 Day 4 (January 26, 2016)

|}

 Day 5 (February 3, 2016)

|}

 Day 6 (February 10, 2016)

|}

 Group I standings:

2016–17 Basketball Champions League, 3rd–tier
The 2016–17 Basketball Champions League was the 1st installment of FIBA's 3rd-tier level European-wide professional club basketball competition Basketball Champions League, running from September 29, 2016 to April 30, 2017. The trophy was won by Iberostar Tenerife, who defeated Banvit by a result of 63–59 at Pabellón Insular Santiago Martín, in San Cristóbal de La Laguna, Spain. Overall, PAOK achieved in the present competition a record of 9 wins against 9 defeats, in five successive rounds. More detailed:

First round
 Bye

Second round
 Bye

Regular season
 Day 1 (October 19, 2016)

|}
*Three overtimes at the end of regulation (65–65, 71–71 and 79–79).

 Day 2 (October 25, 2016)

|}

 Day 3 (November 1, 2016)

|}

 Day 4 (November 8, 2016)

|}

 Day 5 (November 16, 2016)

|}

 Day 6 (November 22, 2016)

|}

 Day 7 (November 30, 2016)

|}
*Overtime at the end of regulation (71–71).

 Day 8 (December 6, 2016)

|}

 Day 9 (December 14, 2016)

|}

 Day 10 (December 21, 2016)

|}

 Day 11 (January 4, 2017)

|}

 Day 12 (January 10, 2017)

|}

 Day 13 (January 18, 2017)

|}

 Day 14 (January 25, 2017)

|}

 Group E standings:

Playoffs qualifiers
 Tie played on February 8, 2017 and on February 22, 2017.

|}

Top 16
 Tie played on February 28, 2017 and on March 8, 2017.

|}

2017–18 Basketball Champions League, 3rd–tier
The 2017–18 Basketball Champions League was the 2nd installment of FIBA's 3rd-tier level European-wide professional club basketball competition Basketball Champions League, running from September 19, 2017 to May 6, 2018. The trophy was won by AEK, who defeated Monaco by a result of 100–94 at O.A.C.A. Olympic Indoor Hall, in Athens, Greece. Overall, PAOK achieved in the present competition a record of 8 wins against 8 defeats, in five successive rounds. More detailed:

First round
 Bye

Second round
 Bye

Third round
 Bye

Regular season
 Day 1 (October 10, 2017)

|}

 Day 2 (October 18, 2017)

|}

 Day 3 (October 24, 2017)

|}

 Day 4 (October 31, 2017)

|}

 Day 5 (November 8, 2017)

|}

 Day 6 (November 15, 2017)

|}

 Day 7 (December 5, 2017)

|}

 Day 8 (December 13, 2017)

|}

 Day 9 (December 20, 2017)

|}
*Overtime at the end of regulation (62–62).

 Day 10 (January 9, 2018)

|}

 Day 11 (January 16, 2018)

|}

 Day 12 (January 24, 2018)

|}

 Day 13 (January 31, 2018)

|}

 Day 14 (February 6, 2018)

|}

 Group B standings:

Top 16
 Tie played on March 6, 2018 and on March 14, 2018.

|}

2018–19 Basketball Champions League, 3rd–tier
The 2018–19 Basketball Champions League was the 3rd installment of FIBA's 3rd-tier level European-wide professional club basketball competition Basketball Champions League, running from September 20, 2018 to May 5, 2019. The trophy was won by Segafredo Virtus Bologna, who defeated Iberostar Tenerife by a result of 73–61 at Sportpaleis in Antwerp, Belgium. Overall, PAOK achieved in the present competition a record of 9 wins against 7 defeats, in five successive rounds. More detailed:

First round
 Bye

Second round
 Bye

Third round
 Bye

Regular season
 Day 1 (October 9, 2018)

|}

 Day 2 (October 16, 2018)

|}

 Day 3 (October 23, 2018)

|}

 Day 4 (October 30, 2018)

|}

 Day 5 (November 6, 2018)

|}

 Day 6 (November 14, 2018)

|}

 Day 7 (November 21, 2018)

|}

 Day 8 (December 12, 2018)

|}

 Day 9 (December 18, 2018)

|}

 Day 10 (January 8, 2019)

|}

 Day 11 (January 16, 2019)

|}

 Day 12 (January 23, 2019)

|}

 Day 13 (January 30, 2019)

|}

 Day 14 (February 5, 2019)

|}

 Group B standings:

Top 16
 Tie played on March 5, 2019 and on March 13, 2019.

|}

Record
PAOK B.C. has overall from 1959–60 (first participation), to 2015–16 (last participation),: 207 wins against 158 defeats in 365 games, in all of the European-wide club basketball competitions.

 EuroLeague: 55–49 (104)
 FIBA Saporta Cup: 48–21 plus 1 draw (70) /// EuroCup: 40–40 (80)
 FIBA Korać Cup: 46–28 (74) /// FIBA EuroCup: 9–12 (21)
 FIBA Europe Champions Cup: 9–7 (16)

References

External links
PAOK B.C. Official Website 
PAOK Thessaloniki History – PAOK Thessaloniki History Provided On Behalf Of Melbourne Club PAOK
PAOKworld – Most informative PAOK Thessaloniki Forum 
PAOKmania – PAOK Thessaloniki Supporters Downloads, Radio and News 

P.A.O.K. BC
Greek basketball clubs in European and worldwide competitions